Playlist: The Very Best of Sir Mix-a-Lot is a compilation album of songs from the Seattle based hip-hop artist Sir Mix-a-Lot, released as part of the Playlist series issued by Sony BMG in 2009.

AllMusic critic Stephen Thomas Erlewine praised the album as a "solid overview" of Sir Mix-a-Lot's songs, and he added that he thought it "serves as both a sampler and introduction".

Track listing

References

Sir Mix-a-Lot albums
2009 compilation albums
Sir Mix-a-Lot